Fort Recovery is an album by Centro-Matic, released in 2006.

Track listing
"Covered Up in Mines" – 4:12
"Calling Thermatico" – 3:53
"Patience for the Ride" – 5:24
"I See Through You" – 3:31
"In Such Crooked Time" – 4:16
"For New Starts" – 4:40
"The Fugitives Have Won" – 2:42
"Monument Sails" – 3:47
"Triggers & Trash Heaps" – 3:15
"Nothin' I Ever Seen" – 3:08
"Take the Maps & Run" – 2:37
"Take a Rake" – 5:47

References

2006 albums
Centro-Matic albums